The first season of the serial crime-thriller television series Millennium commenced airing in the United States on October 25, 1996, concluding on May 16, 1997, and consisting of twenty-two episodes. It tells the story of retired FBI Agent Frank Black (Lance Henriksen). Black has moved to Seattle, Washington with his family and has begun working with a mysterious organization known only as the Millennium Group. He investigates cases with members of the Group and the Seattle Police Department, contributing his remarkable capability of relating to the monsters responsible for horrific crimes. He finds that his daughter has inherited the same "gift" that he has, while the cases become increasingly more personal.

Critics received season one well. Although the show got the highest number of viewers for a pilot episode for the Fox Network at the time, it steadily dropped in the ratings, which led to it losing the Sunday slot to its sister show, The X-Files. The main cast of the show were Henriksen as Frank Black and Megan Gallagher as Catherine Black.

Production

Development 
The original idea behind Millennium came from an episode of The X-Files Chris Carter had written about a serial killer. The episode got Carter thinking about the "monsters" who lurked in the shadows. Later, he started to flesh out a character which would become Frank Black, but he was busy working with other projects at the time. In the mid-1990s, after the success of The X-Files, the Fox Network asked Carter if he could create another show for them.

Originally, the show was planned to include a new "murder mystery" each week, at the same time having a comprehensive storyline. So Carter created the idea of the new millennium, which could give the show its own "feel". He felt he "could capitalise" and at the same time have a new murder mystery every week with a "millennial" twist to it. He also wanted to explore "evil", not the "scientific approach" which was the psychological explanation of "evil". Carter wanted to explore evil through an "unscientific approach", an exploration where "the Bible" played an important role. While clearly stating that the show was not supposed to be heavily grounded in religious text, he felt in many ways that the Bible explained "things on various levels" and "not just in the modern scientific way."

Casting and characters 
Chris Carter had envisioned Lance Henriksen portraying the character of Frank Black, long before he was ever contacted. Although Carter's colleagues responded positively to the selection, the Fox Network wanted someone younger to take the lead part. Fox asked William Hurt to play the lead role, but after finding out that Hurt had no interest in acting on television, Henriksen got the part.

When Henriksen first got the script, he mistook it for a film because of its "powerful" story. He was not fond of the idea of participating in a television project. Henriksen contacted Carter about the character; his first question was "How are you going to make this hero a hero? I mean, it is so dark, how are you going to handle this?" Carter replied saying that Frank was a hero because he was able to "stand-up" against all of this. Henriksen was also worried about the dark "feel" of the show, saying that all shows needs some glimpse of light at the end of the tunnel. According to Carter "The yellow house" was the light, which Henriksen later agreed upon.

Studio executive Ken Horton was very pleased with Megan Gallagher's acting experiences. After winning the audition, she was given a "secret script". Reacting positively towards the script, she later met up with Carter and David Nutter.

Critical reception 
Peter Wunstorf was nominated for an American Society of Cinematographers award for his work on the pilot episode. Lance Henriksen was nominated for a Golden Globe Award for his portrayal of Frank Black but lost to E.R. performer, Anthony Edwards. Co-star Brittany Tiplady was later nominated for a Young Artist Award but failed to win. The show itself was nominated for a People's Choice Award in the category "Favorite Television New Dramatic Series" but did not win. Robert McLachlan was nominated and won a Canadian Society of Cinematographers in 1997. 

The first season was received well by critics. Keith Uhlich of Salon magazine called the season and series "Carter's greatest series", and that, "television work always improves in retrospect; his seemingly haphazard, on-the-fly narratives become more coherent when taken out of the hellish, commercial break-happy context wherein they spawned". Paul Katz of Entertainment Weekly said, "Despite the unapologetic bleakness" of the show, it was Lance Henriksen performance that was the "real killer". Mark Rahner from The Seattle Times said the "X-Files follow-up was uncompromisingly grim, fascinating, cinematically crafted", and that the show was "years ahead" of such "forensic mysteries" as CSI: Crime Scene Investigation. USA Today writer Matt Roush said "With nightmare visions of bleeding walls, charred bodies, decapitations and a grisly live burial", the show took a new "grim view" on "drama".

Although the season premiere received good ratings, the series gradually lost viewers as they were reportedly "turned off by the morose and unnerving story lines."

Main cast

Starring 
 Lance Henriksen as Frank Black
 Megan Gallagher as Catherine Black

Recurring 
 Terry O'Quinn as Peter Watts
 Brittany Tiplady as Jordan Black
 Stephen J. Lang as Det. Bob Giebelhouse
 Bill Smitrovich as Lt. Robert Bletcher

Episodes

Notes

Footnotes

References

External links

 
 

1996 American television seasons
1997 American television seasons